Food and Drug Administration may refer to:
 China Food and Drug Administration (NMPA)
 Food and Drug Administration, a government agency in the United States
 Food and Drug Administration, Maharashtra State, India
 Food and Drug Administration (Myanmar)
 Food and Drug Administration (Philippines)
 Food and Drug Administration (Taiwan)